Shob Choritro is an Indian Bengali language Thriller streaming web series directed by Debasish Sen Sharma. The series starring Anirban Chakrabarti, Paran Bandopadhyay, Iman Chakraborty, Payel Roy, Ankita Majhi, and Judhajit Sarkar are in main role.

Plot
Abinash Mitra, a writer, is looking for a story, a story from a real person. In a tea stall, he meets K.C. Nag, a mathematics maverick whose life he follows with interest. A tragedy occurs when they become engaged in each other's lives. As a result of Abinash's failure with K.C Nag, he encounters Senjhuti and his boyfriend Anwar. Senjhuti dies one fine night after Abinash starts following her. Abinash Consults a psychiatrist to determine whether he has a superpower. A mythological character may be a good subject for his writing, she suggests. The case is taken up by police inspector Debabrata, who begins to conduct an investigation and he finds some clues.

Cast
Anirban Chakrabarti as Abinash Mitra
Paran Bandopadhyay as K.C Nag
Iman Chakraborty as Mrinalini
Payel Roy as Tulika
Ankita Majhi
Judhajit Sarkar

Episodes

References

External links
 

Indian thriller television series
Bengali-language web series